Goodlet Higher Secondary School is a Government-aided school managed by Church of South India located in Sholinghur, Vellore District, Tamil Nadu.

History

References

External links
 

Church of South India schools
Christian schools in Tamil Nadu
Primary schools in Tamil Nadu
High schools and secondary schools in Tamil Nadu
Schools in Vellore district
Educational institutions established in 1885
1885 establishments in India